Intelsat II F-1, also known as Blue Bird was a communications satellite operated by Intelsat. Launched in 1966 it was intended for operations in geostationary orbit over the Pacific Ocean to provide a communications link between Australia and the United States, however a malfunction prevented the satellite from reaching its planned orbit.

In 1966 the "U.S. orbits satellite in aim at Asian Link". The satellite - which a Comsat Corp. spokesman said was nicknamed “Lani” after the Hawaiian word for “bird of heaven”- rocketed from Cape Kennedy at sunset. -ref. a local news paper clipping from OCT 27,1966.

The first of four Intelsat II satellites to be launched, Intelsat II F-1 was built by Hughes Aircraft around the HS-303A satellite bus. It carried two transponders, which were powered by body-mounted solar cells generating 85 watts of power.

Intelsat II F-1 was launched atop a Delta E1 rocket flying from Launch Complex 17B at the Cape Canaveral Air Force Station. The launch, which was successful, took place at 23:05:00 UTC on October 26, 1966, with the spacecraft entering a geosynchronous transfer orbit as planned. The spacecraft was equipped with an SVM-1 apogee motor, which was to be fired to raise the spacecraft into its operational geostationary orbit, however this failed four seconds after ignition. The spacecraft was left in its transfer orbit, unable to complete its primary mission, however it was used for some tests and limited communications.

Intelsat II F-1 remains in orbit.

References

Intelsat satellites
Hughes aircraft
Spacecraft launched in 1966